Chris Paling (born 1956) is a British author of modern fiction.

Biography

Born in 1956 in Derby, Paling studied social sciences at the University of Sussex. He started working as a studio manager for BBC radio in 1981. In the early 1990s he had a Thirty Minute Theatre play called Way Station produced on BBC Radio 4. He wrote more radio plays and later began writing novels.

After the Raid (1995), a wartime study of a shattered mind, was closely followed by Deserters (1996) and Morning All Day (1997). Paling feared The Silent Sentry (1999), about a radio producer who cracks up, might be "the longest resignation letter in history", but he remains a Radio 4 producer to this day. Newton's Swing (2000) was a subtle Stateside thriller; The Repentant Morning (2003) is set in London and Spain in 1936; A Town by the Sea (2005) is a departure from his previous style, leading the reader through a strange landscape of unfamiliar people and places. Minding (2007), nominated for the Mind book of the year, was described as "a delicately and intimately drawn portrait".

Paling wrote a series of plays entitled Words and Music, broadcast by BBC Radio 4 in the summer of 2013. In 2017 his book Reading Allowed: True Stories and Curious Incidents from a Provincial Library was published.

Paling is married with two children, and lives in Brighton.

Bibliography

 After the Raid (1995)
 Deserters (1996)
 Morning All Day (1997)
 The Silent Sentry (1999)
 Newton's Swing (2000)
 The Repentant Morning (2003)
 A Town by the Sea (2005)
 Minding (2007)
 Nimrod's Shadow (2010)
 Reading allowed: True stories and Curious Incidents from a Provincial Library (2017)
 A Very Nice Rejection Letter: Diary of a Novelist. Little, Brown Book, 2021. .

References

External links

1956 births
Living people
20th-century English novelists
21st-century English novelists
English radio writers
Alumni of the University of Sussex
English male novelists
20th-century English male writers
21st-century English male writers